Ernesto Perez Acosta was a Salesian priest. He was Chaplain in the Chaco War and trainer of youngsters.

Youth and studies
The father Ernesto Perez Acosta, popularly known as "Pai Perez" was born in Itauguá on January 17, 1889. Son of Colonel Jose del Carmen Perez, conventional in the Constituent Assembly 1870 and Juana Rosa Acosta.

He joined the school of the Church of Encarnación in the capital. In 1901 he made his first encounter with the Silesians to register as a craftsman student Monsignor Lasagna School led by father Turriccia.

In 1903, just a youngster, he traveled to Uruguay to begin his studies at the Seminary of Manga, near Montevideo. He was ordained priest in 1916, prayed his first Mass in Asuncion in the new chapel of his former school, which was incorporated as a teaching exercise that lasted for eleven years.

Priesthood
In the first year of priesthood there was a transcendent fact, the creation of the notorious Battalion Scouts which it named Don Bosco. With this contingent, under his spiritual direction, they toured large parts of the country marching on foot for a variety of countryside cities of the country. He began his work of education and civic education of young children and Paraguayans, an activity which lasted nearly six decades.

The figure of father Perez soon acquired notoriety; his appealing and educated personality, his affable treatment, and firm discipline of his actions gave him prestige and popularity.

In his priestly ministry he had a very active performance. In 1927 he was appointed director of the Salesian College of the Sacred Heart (Salesianito) and the following year he was appointed Councilor of the City of Asunción.

Experience in Chaco War
In 1930 he was director of the Institute of San Jose Concepcion. At the outbreak of the Chaco War 1932 and as he observed the boarding of the first items to the Chaco and former students - students, could not avoid, snatched by their impulses, accompany them on their uncertain fate. Appointed chaplain, became famous for his participation in the defense of the fort Nanawa, which crashed unsuccessfully powerful Bolivian forces.

Among Masses and confessions, when the situation of defenders was critical, EPI Perez, under its own story, did not hesitate to pawn the gun and join the bloody battle that marked the crystallization of heroism Paraguayan.

The figure of the victorious commander, Colonel Irrazabal he awoke a great admiration, that was mutual affinity, as the warrior kept a respect for the priest unparalleled.

He was chaplain, shortly thereafter, the III Corps. On December 11, 1934, Las Moras in the fort, received the medal Cruz del Chaco, a chance to celebrate the anniversary of the victory of Field Way, the most brilliant tactical operation of the entire war.

On this stage of his life Father Perez wrote the book published in two volumes titled "The struggle of Chaco: what he saw, heard and knew a chaplain"

After the contest, Father Perez, holding the rank of colonel in the nation, returned to their usual activities. In 1936 was ed. Rumbos, body expression of the Catholic Church and two years later was elected vice president of the Paraguayan Federation of Scouting.

On February 20 founded the legendary Battalion Rojas Silva, long memory, naming by the lieutenant who gave tribute to fallen Paraguayan of that name in the fort Surprise, in the run-up to the war. That unit was enriched with the addition of hundreds of young people there learned how to conduct themselves within a framework of uncompromising behavior, acquired stoic spirit, love of country and spiritual formation. It was the forge of which emerged over the years, prominent artists, musicians, athletes and business men possessed all of them deep feelings of Christians.

The body of Scouts marched in towns and cities in the interior accompanied by a cast of waiter’s popular artists and the musicians whose resonances bands aroused lethargy of the monotonous existence of men in the field. Its theatrical evenings were great rejoicing for the inhabitants and very soon some names of its components were notorious.

The artistic group’s battalion Pai Perez was the germ of a multitude of recognized representatives of music and the scene. Ernesto Baez, John Barnabas and many others were products of that generation.

In 1952, he assumed the leadership of Don Bosco College Villarrica and 1958, the School of Agricultural Livestock Carlos Pfannl Coronel Oviedo.

In 1958 was appointed representative in the Salesian Congress Turin, Italy.

Recent years and Death
In celebration of seventy-five years of the arrival of the Salesians, Ernesto Perez gave birth to his "Historical Memory of the Work of the Salesians in Paraguay."

He died on April 28, 1977.

Since 1960, a street of the neighborhood Pettirossi in the capital bears his name.

References
 "Asuncion and its streets." Osvaldo Kalls
 "The Salesian Community of Concepcion, Paraguay. Instituto Salesiano San Jose. " Pe. Carlos Heyn
 "100 Paraguayans of the twentieth century." Collectible magazines Ultima Hora
 "Remembrance of the Work of the Salesians in Paraguay." Ernesto Perez Acosta

External links
 lowercase History of Paraguay
 School Web

1889 births
1977 deaths
People from Itauguá
Paraguayan Roman Catholic priests
People of the Chaco War
History of South America
20th-century Roman Catholic priests